Kalaivani Nagaraj, known professionally as Lady Kash, is a rapper/songwriter from Singapore who started her solo career professionally in 2007. Rapping fluently in English and Tamil, Lady Kash has worked with music composers including A. R. Rahman, Yuvan Shankar Raja, and Anirudh Ravichander. She launched her own company/label AKASHIK in 2013 and continues to beat out independent hip-hop music and videos, alongside working on film soundtracks occasionally. She has performed in various concerts around the globe including Switzerland, UK, Malaysia, Sri Lanka, Dubai and India. In 2021, she was a participant in reality show by TV Network Zee Tamil and producers Banijay Asia, filmed and relayed from Tanzania, East Afria. In the final stage, she was forced to take a decision to exit, putting her health first as the makers of the show did not allow her equal time to rest as they did for other participants. She was instead told to continue participation as the test read negative, despite the COVID symptoms she had possessed for days.

History 
Kalaivani Nagaraj also known as Lady Kash was born to Tamil parents in Singapore. In school, she excelled in Languages and Arts.

Career
Lady Kash began her journey in the music/entertainment industry professionally in 2007.

She has worked with several music composers including the Oscar and Grammy Winning A. R. Rahman, Anirudh Ravichander, Yuvan Shankar Raja, Santhosh Narayanan and Harris Jayaraj to name some. In 2010, she wrote and recorded with A. R. Rahman in the debut soundtrack "Irumbile Oru Irudhaiyam" for the blockbuster movie Enthiran starring superstar Rajinikanth and Aishwarya Rai. The song went on to become the first Tamil soundtrack album to enter and top iTunes US/UK Charts.

In the anthem for World Classical Tamil Conference 2010, "Semmozhiyaana Thamizh Mozhiyaam", she became the youngest and the only female rapper to record for what became the modern-day anthem of the Tamizh language.

The original version of "Oh Penne" by Lady Kash and Anirudh Ravichander which has over 3 million views to date, was originally intended for the film Vanakkam Chennai but was not able to be recorded on time for the soundtrack album, due to schedule. It was hence released as a bonus on YouTube on 17 October 2013 by her label AKASHIK in association with Sony Music India.

In January 2014, Lady Kash made her debut in Bollywood by writing and recording for the soundtrack "Wanna Mashup" composed by A. R. Rahman for the film Highway. The film directed by Imtiaz Ali starred Alia Bhatt and Randeep Hooda.

July 2016 saw two prominent back-to-back releases for Lady Kash. The first being "Naam Hai Futsal" - the official Premier Futsal anthem composed by A. R. Rahman with vocals by A. R. R himself, Virat Kohli, Lady Kash and Karthik. The second, her rendition of Kabali's "Neruppu Da" which went viral amassing over 1 million views in two weeks was released on 14 July. The track was powered by AKASHIK in conjunction with Think Music India.

On A. R. Rahman's 50th Birthday in 2017, Lady Kash released a one take video for a medley titled "Rap Smash" which featured popular rap hits from the composer. She also released a rework of Cardi B's "Bodak Yellow" in support of the #MeToo movement. Currently focusing on original music, the rapper has been putting out singles which includes "I Told You So" in February 2018 and "Villupaattu" on 29 March which is also her birthday. The song was dedicated to the elderly dancer Poongani and Lady Kash went to see her.

Lady Kash was a participant in Survivor reality show by Zee Tamil in 2021. She left the show after exhibiting symptoms of COVID-19 but tested negative.

Awards 
In conjunction with International Women's Day 2013, an organization named Raindrops recognized women achievers across genres and Lady Kash was bestowed the International Female Rapper (Tamil & English) Award. She also received the Social Media Music Champion award at Voice International Music Awards (VIMA) 2013 in Kuala Lumpur, Malaysia earlier in 2013. Kash has also been awarded the Best Genre-Bender award at VIMA 2014 for her track with Anirudh Ravichander, "Oh Penne".

Performances 
She has performed in various concerts around the globe including Switzerland, Canada, Malaysia, Sri Lanka, Dubai and India. In 2014's Infinite Love concert tour by Oscar Winner A. R. Rahman, she also performed the cult hit "Irumbile Oru Irudhaiyam" with the man himself. Her more recent performances include "Rap War" at A. R. Rahman's Nenje Ezhu concert tour series (Chennai, Coimbatore & Madurai) in 2016, "Rap War 2.0" at A. R. Rahman Live in Dubai 2017 and Canada's desiFEST 2017. She also performed twice with Anirudh Ravichander during his first concert in Singapore in 2014 and the 2016 edition. Known to support charity concerts, Lady Kash has always actively participated in social causes and believes in giving back.

Duo (Disbanded) 
In 2008, she had established the rapper-singer duo Lady Kash and Krissy who went on to debut alongside In late 2012, Lady Kash returned to being a solo act and disbanded the duo on mutual terms.

Selected discography

Originals

Soundtracks & projects

Projects

Renditions

Collaboration

Television

References 

 https://web.archive.org/web/20130321235126/http://ladykashonline.com/discography/

Year of birth missing (living people)
Living people
Singaporean musicians
Singaporean hiphop musicians
Singaporean people of Tamil descent
Singaporean people of Indian descent
Singaporean expatriates in India
Expatriate musicians in India
21st-century Singaporean musicians
21st-century Singaporean women singers